Fraser Murdoch (19 September 1990) is a Scottish animator.

Career

Cunningham's Scrap 
Cunningham's Scrap which had the working title of Bab: The Man Who Took Too Much is a short film written and directed by Murdoch. In November 2016, the casting of Scott Kyle and Gregor Firth was announced. The pair played alongside each other in Outlander, where Kyle played Ross and Firth played the role of Kincaid, two of the men of Lallybroch, both of whom Murdoch met whilst working on Outlander.

References

External links 
 
 
 STV Edinburgh Interview Regal Theatre. YouTube
 Radio Saltire 03/01/17 - Scott Kyle on Bab (a Regal Animation Production). YouTube
 Regal Animation: Introduction to the Regal's First Ever Animated Movie!. YouTube
 

Computer animation people
Living people
Alumni of the University of Dundee
People from Kirkcaldy
Scottish animators
Scottish animated film directors
1990 births